Pseudopaguristes is a genus of hermit crabs in the family Diogenidae.

Species 
Species placed by the WoRMS.

 Pseudopaguristes araeos Rahayu, 2007
 Pseudopaguristes asper Rahayu, 2005
 Pseudopaguristes bicolor Asakura & Kosuge, 2004
 Pseudopaguristes bollandi Asakura & McLaughlin, 2003
 Pseudopaguristes calliopsis Forest & de Saint Laurent, 1968
 Pseudopaguristes hians Henderson, 1888
 Pseudopaguristes invisisacculus McLaughlin & Provenzano, 1974
 Pseudopaguristes janetkae McLaughlin, 2002
 Pseudopaguristes kuekenthali de Man, 1902
 Pseudopaguristes laurentae Morgan & Forest, 1991
 Pseudopaguristes marocanus A. Milne-Edwards & Bouvier, 1892
 Pseudopaguristes mclaughlinae Rahayu, 2008
 Pseudopaguristes monoporus Morgan, 1987
 Pseudopaguristes pachydactylus Rahayu, 2008
 Pseudopaguristes shidarai Asakura, 2004

References 

Crustacean genera
Diogenidae